The , also known as the Department of Shinto Affairs, Department of Rites, Department of Worship, as well as Council of Divinities, was a Japanese Imperial bureaucracy established in the 8th century, as part of the ritsuryō reforms. However, the department and Daijō-kan made its first appearance in the Asuka Kiyomihara Code.

While Daijō-kan handled secular administrative affairs of the country, Jingi-kan oversaw almost all matters related to Shintō, particularly of kami worship.

While the department existed for almost a century, there are periods of time in Japanese ancient and medieval history where jingi-kan was effectively inexistent, parallel to the evolution of the ritsuryō system and Shinto, such as when the establishment of jingi-kan was burned down during Ōnin War (1467-1477).

Term 
The term , also known as amatsukami which translates to "celestial deities" or "heavenly gods" encompasses all kami gods in Shinto that resides in Takamagahara or "High Plains of Heaven," from whom the Japanese imperial line supposedly descended. The term , also known as kunitsukami, translates to "terrestrial deities" or "earthly gods" and encompasses all kami gods in Shinto that resides in or have appeared on the earth. Colloquially, the term jingi can also be used to refer to the rituals performed to the heavenly and earthly gods.

Therefore, there are several ways to translate the term jingi-kan in English:

 "Department of Divinities" or "Council of Divinities," where the term jingi is used to refer to both heavenly and earthly gods. This is the most common translation used in English.
 "Department of Rites" or "Council of Rites," where the term jingi refers not to the heavenly and earthly gods but to the rites performed for these gods.
 "Department of Shinto Affairs" or "Council of Shinto Affairs," where "Shinto Affairs" refer to the general function of jingi-kan, that is to oversee all matters related to Shintō.

Ritsuryō Jingi-kan 
This Shinto administrative hierarchy was an intentional mirror of its Chinese counterpart, the Ministry of Rites (禮部).  The Jingi-kan was charged with oversight of Shinto clergy and rituals for the whole country.

Hierarchy 
The Jingikan was staffed by four levels of managers, as seen below:

Functions 
In its early days, jingi-kan has four main functions:

 Carries out annual rites written in jingiryō as well as overall coordination of shrine rites
 Provides ritualists who assist the sovereign and his court in the performance of palace ceremonies
 When misfortune struck or to determine the cause of ominous events, it performs divination to determine the identity of the responsible Kami. 
 Conducts the distribution of tribute offerings (heihaku) to shrines for four annual rituals: Kinensai (Toshigoi no Matsuri), the spring and autumn Tsukinamisai, and Niinamesai.

Annual Rites 
Jingi-kan must carry out thirteen rites written in jingiryō. The rites are laid out in articles 2 through 9, as well as article 18. Those rituals are:

Jingi-kan in Medieval Japan
From the 10th century to the 15th, the Shirakawa-hakuō family held this position continuously. 

In feudal Japan, the Jingi-kan became the final surviving building of the Heian Palace. During the Jōkyū War in 1221, most of the palace was evacuated and fell into disrepair; the Jingi-kan alone remained in operation. A 1624 memoir by a Jingi-haku reports that the Jingi-kan was still being used as late as 1585 and was demolished during renovations. In 1626, a temporary building was constructed to perform additional ceremonies.

Meiji Jingi-kan 
On the thirteenth day of the third month of 1868, Emperor Meiji announced that the new Meiji government would restore direct imperial rule (王政復古, ōsei fukko) and unity of rites and government (祭政一致, saisei itchi). The department was reinstated in 1868 at the beginning of the Meiji period as a provisional step to achieve saisei itchi.

After 1871 
In 1870, the Meiji administration attempted to create a new national religion under the term , primarily to keep Christianity from accumulating popularity and influence on the Japanese society and to reeducate the population about the significance of the imperial rule. The attempt lasted from 1870 to 1884. Consequentially, in addition to overseeing Shintō affairs, jingi-kan also had the role to oversee propaganda. 

The goals of the Great Teaching campaign was deemed too ambiguous or too general to be able to be formed into practice, making it difficult for jingi-shō to provide a theoretical and spiritual content to be spread among the public. In addition to that, jingi-shō also lacked staffs to oversee their two major functions, Shintō affairs and propaganda. Because of these two reasons, jingi-shō was abandoned and dissolved, and the Meiji administration established Ministry of Religion (教部省, kyōbushō), also known as Ministry of Doctrine.

See also
 Engishiki, volume 1-10
 State Shinto
 Unity of religion and rule

Notes

External links
Kokugakuin University, Encyclopedia of Shinto,  "Concepts of Emperor and State" (Jingi-kan)

Former government ministries of Japan
8th-century establishments in Japan
History of Shinto
State Shinto